Strong Style Evolved is a series of professional wrestling television specials produced by New Japan Pro Wrestling (NJPW). The specials air on AXS in the United States and internationally on NJPW World. The inaugural event took place live on March 26 with the second taking place across two days in the United Kingdom on June 30 and July 1. The event will return in 2022.

Events

See also
 List of major NJPW events

References

External links

Recurring events established in 2018
Events in Long Beach, California
March 2018 events in the United States
Professional wrestling in California
Professional wrestling in the United Kingdom